Peter Bruce Noble  is an Australian entrepreneur active in the music industry for almost 50 years. He is best known as the festival director of the annual Bluesfest Byron Bay, which has been running since 1990 & that he became a partner of in 1994. The 5-day festival is now held every Easter at the Tyagarah Tea Tree Farm, just north of Byron Bay, a New South Wales beachside town.

Peter Noble's significant contribution to the industry was recognised in 2014 when he was awarded The Rolling Stone Australia Award for his services to Australian Music. On Australia Day 2016, he was awarded the Medal of the Order of Australia (OAM) for service to live and recorded music, to tourism, and to the community.

By the time Bluesfest turned 25 years old it had won 27 awards including four Australian Helpmann Awards for Best Contemporary Music Festival and Australian Event of the Year at the Australian Event Awards, nominations at the prestigious Pollstar Awards for Best International Music Festival, received 17 further award nominations. It was the only Australian festival listed in Billboard's 2014 Top 10 festivals.

Biography
Peter Noble has been a music industry professional for over forty years and his contribution to the industry has been recognised with many accolades including the Rolling Stone Award for his services to Australian music.

Drawn to music from an early age, the Sydney-born bassist played in rock, soul and blues bands during the 1960s and '70s, taking leading roles with artists including Clapham Junction, and Marcia Hines. Following extensive national and international touring, Peter settled in the US and set up Portland, Oregon's first International Jazz Festival, and was house booker at The Earth venue.

Peter returned home to Australia at the beginning of the 1980s, and became a pioneer for blues touring in Australia. As a direct result of Noble's efforts, soul, jazz, blues and reggae artists found a promoter, and a wide audience in Australia for the first time.

He supplied two international acts for the East Coast Blues Festival with Canned Heat in 1990 & John Mayall in 1991 and became a director alongside founder Keven Oxford for the 1994 event. In December 2004 Noble along with four partners acquired founder Keven Oxford's 50% share in the event.

Peter became a pioneer for blues, jazz, roots and indie music touring in Australia, as well as running AIM Records, which became the first and only Australian independent label to win a Grammy Award in 2008 for ‘Best Zydeco Or Cajun Music Album’, by Terrance Simien & The Zydeco Experience. The same year the label got nominated for a second Grammy for Best Tropical Album 'Greetings From Havana'. Noble has worked in many areas of the music business including record producing, touring artists through his company Bluesfest Touring, artist management, setting up the Australian Artists Agency in the early '70s, event site development, and festival presentations throughout Australia and South East Asia.

Noble's long-standing dream to produce an Indigenous festival was realised in 2013 when he collaborated with leading cultural creative Rhoda Roberts, producing the inaugural Boomerang Festival: a ground-breaking Indigenous festival for all Australians held at the home of Bluesfest, the Tyagarah Tea Tree Farm, to extensive acclaim.

As the Director of the Byron Bay festival, Peter is passionate about social and environmental responsibility and is philanthropic, supporting many charities and community groups, and ensuring his events uphold their commitment to environmental conservation and animal welfare. This is reflected in the festival winning six International A Greener Festival Awards since 2007.

Bluesfest is respected for creating ongoing employment and contracts for individuals and small businesses in the Byron Bay and the Northern Rivers, a small regional part of Australia with limited employment opportunities. It contributes over $40 million annually to the NSW economy, and has provided countless opportunities for local musicians, artists and business people through performance platforms, stalls, and networks.

Peter Noble's son Otis Noble is a renowned figurehead of alcohol brand 'Fireball'.

Peter Noble is an ardent music aficionado whose work has shaped what is now cemented as one of the largest and revered music events in the world. He spends his time working and living between Byron Bay and Bali.

Awards

Awards summary – Bluesfest 
1 win at the Keeping the Blues Alive Awards Memphis - For Festival Director Peter Noble
8 wins at the NSW Tourism Awards for Major Festivals & Events (6 Gold, 2 Silver)
6 wins at the North Coast Tourism Awards for Major Festivals & Events
4 wins at the Helpmann Awards for Best Contemporary Music Festival, Ceremony for Australia's most talented and celebrated performers and industry
6 wins at the Australian Event Awards for Australian Event of the Year
10 nominations at the Pollstar Awards (US) for International Festival of the Year (6 in a row from 2012- incl 2017)
1 nomination at the Pollstar Awards (US) for International Festival of the Decade 

Bluesfest Awards
2022   Gold Major Festivals & Events, NSW Tourism Award
2019   Best Regional Event, Australian Event Awards 
2018   Best Cultural, Arts or Music Event - Australian Event Awards  
2018   Keeping the Blues Alive Award Memphis - For Festival Director Peter Noble
2017   Gold Major Festivals & Events - NSW Tourism Awards (After winning Gold 3rd time in a row Bluesfest entered the NSW Tourism Hall of Fame) 
2017   Best Regional Event, Australian Event Awards 
2016   Gold Major Festival & Events, NSW Tourism Awards 
2016   Best Regional Event, Australian Event Awards  
2016   Gold Major Festivals & Events, North Coast Tourism Awards
2016   Order of Australia Medal (OAM), Won by Festival Director, Peter Noble ‘For service to live and recorded music, to  tourism, and to the community.’
2015   Gold Major Festivals & Events, NSW Tourism Awards
2015   Gold Major Festivals & Events, North Coast Tourism Awards
2015   Pan Australasian Festival Of The Year, Canadian Music Week International Festival Awards
2014 	Best Contemporary Music Festival, Australian Helpmann Awards
2014   Best Cultural, Arts or Music Event, Australian Event Award
2014 	Gold Major Festival & Event, North Coast Tourism Awards 
2014 	'The Rolling Stone Award' Won by Festival Director, Peter Noble
2014 	Silver Major Festivals & Events, NSW Tourism Awards
2013 	Silver Best Cultural, Arts or Music Event  Australian Event Awards  
2013 	Gold Major Festivals & Events, NSW Tourism Awards
2013 	Gold Major Festivals & Events, North Coast Tourism Awards
2013 	Best Regional Event, Australian Event Awards
2013 	Best Contemporary Music Festival Australian Helpmann Awards
2013 	Business Excellence Award, North Coast Tourism Awards
2012/13 The International A Greener Festival Award
2012 	Silver Major Festival & Events, NSW Tourism Awards
2012 	Business Excellence Award, North Coast Tourism Awards  
2011 	The International A Greener Festival Award
2011 	Gold Major Festivals & Events, NSW Tourism Awards
2011 	Business Excellence Award, North Coast Tourism Awards  
2010 	Australian Event of the Year, Australian Event Awards
2010 	The International A Greener Festival Award 
2009 	The International A Greener Festival Award 
2008	Grammy Award, ‘Best Zydeco Or Cajun Music Album’, Terrance Simien & The Zydeco Experience (AIM Records artist)
2008 	The International A Greener Festival Award  
2007 	The International A Greener Festival Award 
2006 	Best Contemporary Music Festival, Australian Helpmann Awards
2005 	Best Contemporary Music Festival, Australian Helpmann Awards
1998 – 2013 Readers Poll Award, Rhythms Magazine – "Best Australian Festival" 
1994 -96 Readers Poll Award, Rhythms Magazine – "Best Australian Festival"

BLUESFEST TOURING AWARDS 
2017   Best International Contemporary  Concert for Patti Smith and Her Band Australia Tour 2017, Australian Helpmann Awards

BLUESFEST NOMINATIONS
2022   Pollstar Awards (USA) for International Festival of the Year
2022   Best Cultural/Arts Event, Australian Event Awards
2021   Pollstar Awards (USA) for International Festival of the Decade  
2019   Pollstar Awards (USA) for International Festival of the Year 
2017   Best Contemporary Music Festival, Australian Helpmann Awards
2016   International Music Festival of the Year, 28th Pollstar Awards (2017)
2016   Best Contemporary Music Festival, Australian Helpmann Awards
2015   International Music Festival of the Year, 27th Pollstar Awards (2016)
2015   Best Contemporary Music Festival Australian Helpmann Awards
2014 	Major Festivals & Events, NSW Tourism Awards 
2014 	Best Cultural, Arts or Music Event, Australian Event Awards 
2014 	Best Tourism Event, Australian Event Awards 
2014 	Best Regional Event, Australian Event Awards 
2014 	Best New Event for Boomerang Festival, Australian Event Awards 
2013 	International Festival of the Year 25th Pollstar Awards (2014)
2013 	Best Tourism Event, Australian Event Awards
2012 	International Festival of the Year 24th Pollstar Awards (2013)
2012 	Best Cultural/Arts Event, Australian Event Awards
2012 	Best Contemporary Music Festival, Robert Helpmann Awards
2011 	Best Regional Event, Australian Event Awards 
2011 	Best Achievement in Sustainability, Australian Event Awards 
2009 	Best Cultural or Arts Event, Australian Event Awards 
2009 	Best Overseas Festival, UK Festival Awards 
2008	Grammy Award, ‘Best Tropical Latin Album’, Greetings From Havana - Cubanismo (AIM Records artist)
2008 	Best Contemporary Music Festival, Australian Helpmann Awards
2007 	International Music Festival of the Year from the esteemed US based Pollstar Concert Industry Awards

References

External links
 Bluesfest Touring
 AIM Records
 Timbre Rock & Roots

Australian businesspeople
Helpmann Award winners
Impresarios
Music promoters